Mema Tiango (born 29 October 1991) is long-distance runner from Botswana. She competed in the senior women's race at the 2019 IAAF World Cross Country Championships held in Aarhus, Denmark. She finished in 109th place.

In 2017, she competed in the senior women's race at the 2017 IAAF World Cross Country Championships held in Kampala, Uganda. She finished in 92nd place.

References

External links 
 

Living people
1991 births
Place of birth missing (living people)
Botswana female long-distance runners
Botswana female cross country runners